Gerard Granollers and Adrián Menéndez-Maceiras won the title, beating Maximilian Neuchrist and Divij Sharan 1–6, 6–3, [10–6]

Seeds

Draw

Draw

References
 Main Draw

KPIT MSLTA Challenger - Doubles